The Beggar's Wedding is a 1729 ballad opera by the Irish writer Charles Coffey. Part of a boom in ballad operas following the success of John Gay's The Beggar's Opera, it originally premiered at the Smock Alley Theatre in Dublin in March 1729 before appearing in London  at the Haymarket Theatre on 29 May 1729 The original Dublin cast included Richard Elrington.

References

Bibliography
 Burling, William J. A Checklist of New Plays and Entertainments on the London Stage, 1700-1737. Fairleigh Dickinson Univ Press, 1992.
 Greene, John C. & Clark, Gladys L. H. The Dublin Stage, 1720-1745: A Calendar of Plays, Entertainments, and Afterpiece. Lehigh University Press, 1993.
 Nicoll, Allardyce. A History of Early Eighteenth Century Drama: 1700-1750. CUP Archive, 1927.

1729 operas
Ballad operas
English-language operas
Works by Charles Coffey